is the fifth single of the Hello! Project subgroup Minimoni. It was released on April 24, 2002 and sold 212,230 copies.

A double A-side, its title tracks were both built around the interjection "Aiin!", which Shimura had already established as a catch phrase.

Track listing 
The lyrics to "Aiin Taisō" were written by Hiroyuki Tomonaga; its music was composed by Akihiko Takashima. "Aiin! Dance no Uta" was written and composed by Tsunku.
 
 
 "Aiin Taisō (Original Karaoke)"
 "Aiin! Dance No Uta (Original Karaoke)"

Members at the time of single

References

External links 
 Aiin Taisō/Aiin! Dance no Uta entry on the Up-Front Works website

Zetima Records singles
Minimoni songs
2002 singles
Song recordings produced by Tsunku
Japanese-language songs
2002 songs
Songs about dancing